Commando Squadron is an elite special force within the Commonwealth of the Bahamas. It is the amphibious infantry unit of the Royal Bahamas Defence Force. It is composed of approximately 150 marines  equipped with only light infantry weapons. Marines selected for this unit go through three months of training, where they are taught field craft, small craft handling, land navigation, close quarter battle  and small arms handling. After completion they go through a five-month Commando Course where they are additionally trained in reconnaissance and counter-terrorism. The Combat Diver and Military Diver courses are optional, but may be mandatory depending on the need for divers throughout the Defence Force. Marines successful in completing the Commando course are distinguished by a red dagger and commando tab worn on the left sleeve pocket and a black beret badge as opposed to the bronze badge worn by other members of the Defence Force.

Physical requirements

 Pushups: 75 in under 2 mins
 Situps: 85 in under 2 mins
 Pullups: 20 (not timed)
 Burpees: 41 in under 1.5 mins
 1.5 mile run: 10 mins 
 300 m swim: 10 mins
 Water tread: 3 mins
 Dive: 25 ft
 The physical assessment is done in battle dress uniform and boots. Additionally the selected commandos do a 1-mile swim with a ruck sack and weapon along with a 1-hour tread.

Weapons used 

 IMI Uzi
 IMI Galil ARM
 FN FAL DMR
 The FN MAG has been used in training exercises as a support machine gun.
 Colt M4A1
 Beretta 92FS
 Sig Sauer P226
 Remington 870
 Remington 700

References

See also
 Royal Bahamas Defence Force
 Government of the Bahamas

Military units and formations of the Bahamas
Royal Bahamas Defence Force